"Marcella" is a song by the American rock band the Beach Boys from their 1972 album Carl and the Passions – "So Tough". Written by Brian Wilson, Jack Rieley, and Tandyn Almer, the lyrics were inspired by Wilson's fixation with a local massage therapist. It is the last song to feature Bruce Johnston during his original tenure in the band.

Background
The verse melody of "Marcella" branched from an earlier track entitled "I Just Got My Pay" (recorded during sessions for Sunflower) which itself branched from another discarded song called "All Dressed Up for School" (recorded during the making of The Beach Boys Today!). Both songs were released on the 1993 box set Good Vibrations: Thirty Years of The Beach Boys.

"Marcella" was written about a real woman that Wilson knew. Music journalist Nick Kent explains that she "worked at a parlour just off the strip called Circus Maximus" and had allowed Wilson to "stay and talk to her even though she was aware most of what he said was crazy bullshit." According to Jack Rieley:

Wilson later said that one of the lead guitar parts was inspired by George Harrison's playing, namely, Harrison's solo on "Let It Be" (1970). On another occasion, Wilson said that the song "represents one of the first times we tried to emulate The Rolling Stones. In my mind, it was dedicated to the Stones, but I never told them that. It's one of the rockingest songs I ever wrote."

Recording

"Marcella" was recorded on February 17, 1972 during the same session for "Out in the Country" and "Body Talk" at the Beach Boys' Bel Air studio.

Release
"Marcella" (backed with "Hold On Dear Brother") was released on June 26, 1972 as the album's second single. It failed to chart.

Personnel
Credits from Craig Slowinski, John Brode, Will Crerar and Joshilyn Hoisington.

The Beach Boys
Ricky Fataar - drums, castanets
Al Jardine - backing vocals
Bruce Johnston - backing vocals
Mike Love - lead and backing vocals
Brian Wilson - backing vocals, grand piano, Wurlitzer electric piano, Hammond organ, Moog synthesizer (bass), vibraphone
Carl Wilson - lead and backing vocals, electric & acoustic guitars, producer
Dennis Wilson - backing vocals

Additional musicians
Tandyn Almer - autoharps
Billy Hinsche - backing vocals
Tony Martin Jr. - pedal steel guitars
Jack Rieley - backing vocals
unidentified players - 2 trumpets, trombone, bass trombone, sleigh bells, cabasa, bongos

References

External links
 
 
 

1972 singles
The Beach Boys songs
Songs written by Jack Rieley
Songs written by Brian Wilson
Songs written by Tandyn Almer
Reprise Records singles
Songs based on actual events